Meridian Peak is a mountain in the Absaroka Range in the state of Montana, United States. The mountain is included in Yellowstone National Park.

Etymology 
According to the United States Geological Survey, the name variation Meridan Peak is due to a misspelling.

References

Mountains of Montana
Mountains of Park County, Montana